Gregg Jeffrey Costa (born June 19, 1972) is an American attorney who is a former  United States circuit judge of the United States Court of Appeals for the Fifth Circuit and former United States district judge of the United States District Court for the Southern District of Texas.

Early life and education 

Costa was born in Baltimore, Maryland, but grew up in Richardson, Texas, where he attended Richardson High School. He earned a Bachelor of Arts degree in 1994 from Dartmouth College. While at Dartmouth, Costa interned for the Democratic National Committee. After college, Costa taught elementary school in Sunflower, Mississippi as part of the Teach for America program from 1994 until 1996. He then earned a Juris Doctor from the University of Texas School of Law in 1999, where he was the Editor-in-Chief of the Texas Law Review. From 1999 until 2000, Costa served as a law clerk to Judge A. Raymond Randolph on the U.S. Court of Appeals for the District of Columbia Circuit. He then served as a law clerk to Chief Justice William Rehnquist on the U.S. Supreme Court from 2001 until 2002.

Career 

From 2002 until 2005, Costa worked as an associate at the law firm Weil, Gotshal & Manges in Houston. From 2005–2012, Costa served as an Assistant United States Attorney in the Southern District of Texas.

Allen Stanford prosecution 

Likely Costa's highest-profile prosecution in his six years as a federal prosecutor was the case against convicted Ponzi schemer Allen Stanford, who was indicted in 2009. In January 2011, Stanford's legal team requested a delay of the start of his scheduled January 24, 2011 trial, noting that they had only taken over his defense in October 2010. Costa told the judge presiding over the trial that while he did not object to some delay in the trial, "the requested continuance of two years is excessive." In February 2011, Stanford sued Costa and his fellow prosecutor Paul Pelletier, along with several employees of the Securities and Exchange Commission and the Federal Bureau of Investigation, complaining of "abusive law enforcement" and seeking $7.2 billion in damages. In March 2011, Stanford's attorneys argued that the defendant's right to a speedy trial had been violated. Costa, however, told the Associated Press that delays largely were the result of Stanford's own requests for continuances. In March 2012, Stanford was found guilty on 13 of 14 counts including fraud, obstructing investigators and conspiracy to commit money laundering.

Federal judicial service

District court service 

In July 2011, Texas's two Republican senators, John Cornyn and Kay Bailey Hutchison, sent a letter to President Barack Obama, recommending that he nominate Costa to the vacant seat on the United States District Court for the Southern District of Texas that had been created when Judge John David Rainey took senior status in June 2010. The seat would be based in the Galveston Division. The anticipated nomination earned bipartisan support, as Democratic United States Representative Lloyd Doggett, who serves as the spokesman for Texas Democrats on federal judicial matters, urged the president to nominate Costa as well. On September 8, 2011, President Obama nominated Costa to the seat on the U.S. District Court for the Southern District of Texas. He received a hearing by the Senate Judiciary Committee on November 2, 2011, and his nomination was reported to the floor on December 1, 2011. Costa's nomination was approved by the U.S. Senate on April 26, 2012, by a 97–2 vote. He received his commission the same day. His service as a district court judge was terminated on June 2, 2014 when he was elevated to the 5th Circuit Court.

Court of appeals service 
On December 19, 2013 President Obama nominated Judge Costa to a seat on the U.S. Court of Appeals for the Fifth Circuit vacated by Fortunato Benavides, who assumed senior status. He received a hearing before the U.S. Senate Judiciary Committee on February 25, 2014. On March 27, 2014, Costa's nomination was reported out of committee by a voice vote. On May 13, 2014, Senate Majority Leader Harry Reid filed for cloture on Costa's nomination. On May 15, 2014 the Senate voted 58–36 to invoke cloture. On May 20, 2014, the Senate confirmed him by a 97–0 vote. He received his commission on June 2, 2014. In January 2022, Costa announced he would be resigning from the 5th Circuit Court in August 2022. Costa resigned on August 31, 2022.

Cases

Costa dissented in Collins v. Mnuchin (5th Cir. 2019), a ruling that struck down the Federal Housing Finance Agency as a violation of the separation of powers and was affirmed by the Supreme Court in Collins v. Yellen. Costa argued that the Court violates the separation of powers itself by ruling that Congress violated the separation of powers by creating an independent agency.

See also 
 List of Hispanic/Latino American jurists
 List of law clerks of the Supreme Court of the United States (Chief Justice)

References

External links

1972 births
Living people
21st-century American judges
Assistant United States Attorneys
Dartmouth College alumni
Educators from Texas
Hispanic and Latino American judges
Judges of the United States Court of Appeals for the Fifth Circuit
Judges of the United States District Court for the Southern District of Texas
Law clerks of the Supreme Court of the United States
People from Bellaire, Texas
People from Richardson, Texas
Teach For America alumni
United States court of appeals judges appointed by Barack Obama
United States district court judges appointed by Barack Obama
University of Texas School of Law alumni